The  Wingsbach is a small right tributary of the  Ahr river. It has a length of 4.5 km and a drainage area of 5.4 km2. Colloquially it is also referred to as Maibach and in its upper course is also named Talbach.

Course
The source of the Wingsbach is located at the southeastern slopes of the mountain Häuschen, from there the brook flows north towards the Ahr river. About half a kilometer from its source it receives its only significant tributary the Häusschenbach arriving from the west and originating at the slopes of the Häuschen as well. Not long after receiving the Häusschenbach the brook passes two small ponds to which it provides water and a bit further down another two ponds. The upper part of the brook up to this point it also called Talbach, after that it is called Wingsbach only. Whereas the upper part  was mostly forrested, the brook now flows through meadows and passes the vinery Maibachfarm (earlier known as chicken farm Maibach) on its left. Then for the final part of its course it enters a small ravine before it finally empties into the Ahr river just next to the former Kalvarienberg monastery. Opposite of the Wingsbach's mouth on the other side of the Ahr river lies Walporzheim, a district of Bad Neuenahr-Ahrweiler.

Maibachfarm and Maibachklamm 
In its lower part the Wingsbach passes through a small ravine, the so-called Maibachklamm. A narrow footpath with twelve small wooden bridges follows the brook through the ravine, it is part of the Ahrsteig, a longer hiking trail along the Ahr river. The footpath and its bridges were first constructed in 1929 as measure to foster tourism in the region. Not far from the southern end of the ravine lies the Maibachfarm vinery, which also features rooms and a restaurant. The Maibachfarm was originally constructed as a simple farm in the 1920s by Phillipp Mies as first attempt to use the valley of the Wingsbach for agriculture. Mies however sold it 1931 to Josef Hildebrandt, who turned the compound into a chicken farm. Soon Hildebrandt added a restaurant and started to offer rooms as well. Over the years the restaurant developed into a popular destination for (local) hikers and tourists and was run by the Hildebrandt family until 1997, when it changed owners and became part of the current vinery.

Further reading 
Ahrweiler: Ein Spaziergang durch eine Welt voller zauberhafter Winkel – Die Maibachklamm. In: Daniel Robbel/Dirk Unschuld:: 111 Orte im Ahrtal, die man gesehen haben muss, ISBN 978-3-7408-0850-1, Emons-Verlag 2020, S. 32 f.
Jürgen Plogmann: Weinwandern Ahr - Mittelrhein: 48 Touren mit GPS-Tracks''. Bergverlag Rother GmbH, 2020, ISBN  9783763332021, S. 62
Werner Schüller: Von der Maibachfarm und dem Maibachklämmchen in Ahrweiler. Heimatjahrbuch Kreis Ahrweiler, 2013, S. 204-206

References

External links 
Wingsbach at the AW-Wiki (German)
Simun Sustic: Zwölf Brücken, ein Kloster und ein Bunker: Winterwanderung auf dem Ahrsteig. General Anzeiger, 30January 2021 (German)
Ein Nachmittag auf dem Ahrsteig (trail description, German)
Wandern auf Etappe 6 des Ahrsteigs: Von Bad Neuenahr nach Walporzheim (trail description, German)